"South of the Border Down Mexico Way" is a popular song describing a trip to Mexico, written by Jimmy Kennedy and Michael Carr and published in 1939 for the film of the same name starring country star Gene Autry.

Background  
In the lyrics, a man looks back with regret for having left a woman he can't forget. When he returns much later, she is preparing to wed, presumably to either the church or another man. In the movie, however, she has become a nun to atone for her brother's crimes. Members of the Western Writers of America chose it as one of the Top 100 Western songs of all time.

Recordings
The song was a hit in 1939 for Shep Fields, vocal by Hal Derwin, reaching the No.1 spot for five weeks.  Other successful recordings in 1939 were by Guy Lombardo, Gene Autry, Ambrose (vocal by Denny Dennis) and Tony Martin.

Other notable recordings
Frank Sinatra recorded the song on April 30, 1953 for Capitol Records and it reached the Billboard charts with a top position of #18 in a 4-week stay.
Al Bowlly recorded May 11, 1939 (see Al Bowlly discography)
Acker Bilk – included in the album Clarinet Moods (2002)
Asleep at the Wheel, with vocals by George Strait, for their 2015 album Still the King - Celebrating the Music of Bob Wills and his Texas Playboys
Bing Crosby included in his album Bing Crosby's Treasury – The Songs I Love (1965)
Chris Isaak for his album Baja Sessions (1996)
Chuck Berry – for the album Chuck Berry (1975) (a few liberties taken with the lyrics)
Dean Martin for his album Dino Latino (1962)
Engelbert Humperdinck – for the album The Winding Road (2007)
Fats Domino included in his album Here He Comes Again! (1963)
Frankie Laine (1953)
Gale Storm – issued as a single and also included in the album Gale Storm Sings (1957)
Gene Merlino – for The Simpsons episode "Kamp Krusty"
Herb Alpert for his album South of the Border (1964)
Keely Smith for the album Keely Sings Sinatra (2001)
Malcolm Vaughan – included in the EP Requests for Malcolm Vaughan (1960)
Marty Robbins – released in his posthumous collection Under Western Skies, released in 1995.
Mel Tormé – included in the album ¡Olé Tormé!: Mel Tormé Goes South of the Border with Billy May (1959)
Patsy Cline – included in her album Showcase (1961)
Don Mclean – included in his album Prime Time (1977)
Patti Page – recorded for her album Let's Get Away from It All (1957)
Perry Como recorded for his album We Get Letters (1957)
Russ Conway – for his album Piano Requests (1958)
Sam Cooke – included in his Cooke's Tour album (1960)
The Shadows – for their album Out of the Shadows (1962)
Slim Whitman – included in the album In Love the Whitman Way (1968)
Willie Nelson – for his album What a Wonderful World (1988) and for his album ''Let's Face the Music and Dance (2013)

References

1939 songs
1939 singles
Al Bowlly songs
Frank Sinatra songs
Guy Lombardo songs
Pop standards
Songs with lyrics by Jimmy Kennedy
Songs with music by Michael Carr (composer)
Number-one singles in Australia